Canal Park may refer to a place in the United States:

 Canal Park (Duluth), Minnesota, a neighborhood
 Canal Park (Akron, Ohio), a baseball stadium